Emjae Frazier (born January 29, 2004), frequently stylized as eMjae or éMjae, is an American artistic gymnast and a member of the United States women's national gymnastics team (2019–present).  She is the younger sister of Margzetta Frazier.

Early life 
Frazier was born in New Jersey in 2004.  She started gymnastics because of her sister, Margzetta.

Gymnastics career

Junior

2018 
Frazier qualified as an elite gymnast in early 2018.  In early July she competed at the American Classic where she placed 19th in the all-around.  Later that month she competed at the 2018 U.S. Classic where she placed 27th in the all-around.

2019 
In June Frazier competed at the American Classic where she placed 23rd in the all-around but third on vault.  The following month she competed at the U.S. Classic where she placed seventh in the all-around.

In August Frazier competed at her first U.S. National Championships.  She placed ninth in the all-around and was named to the junior national team for the first time.  In November she tore three ligaments in her right knee.

Senior

2020–21 
Frazier turned senior in 2020.  Most competition were canceled or postponed due to the COVID-19 pandemic.  However she was selected to compete at the Friendship and Solidarity Meet where she was part of the gold medal winning Solidarity Team.

Frazier started 2021 competing at the 2021 Winter Cup where she placed 21st on the balance beam.  In May she competed at the U.S. Classic where she placed 12th in the all-around.  At the National Championships Frazier finished 20th in the all-around and was not selected to compete at the Olympic Trials.

In October Frazier finished second at the World selection trials behind Kayla DiCello; as a result she was selected to compete at the 2021 World Championships and she was re-added to the national team.  While there she finished ninth on floor exercise and 40th on uneven bars; she did not advance to any event finals.

2022 
Frazier competed at the 2022 Winter Cup where she placed third in the all-around behind Konnor McClain and Skye Blakely. As a result she was selected to compete at the upcoming DTB Pokal Team Challenge in Stuttgart alongside McClain, Blakely, Nola Matthews, and Ashlee Sullivan. She helped the team finish first.  In April Frazier competed at the 2022 City of Jesolo Trophy alongside McClain, Shilese Jones, Zoe Miller, and Elle Mueller. They won the team event with a score 164.065; she placed sixth in the all-around.  During event finals she won silver on floor exercise behind McClain.

With the California Golden Bears

2023 
On March 3, 2023, Frazier became the first person on the California Golden Bears women's gymnastics team to receive a perfect 10 for her floor routine.

Career perfect 10.0

Regular season ranking

Competitive history

References

External links
 
 

2004 births
Living people
American female artistic gymnasts
African-American female gymnasts
U.S. women's national team gymnasts
People from Gloucester Township, New Jersey
California Golden Bears women's gymnasts